The FIBT World Championships 1971 took place in Cervinia, Italy.

Two man bobsleigh

Four man bobsleigh

Medal table

References
2-Man bobsleigh World Champions
4-Man bobsleigh World Champions

IBSF World Championships
1971 in bobsleigh
International sports competitions hosted by Italy
Bobsleigh in Italy 
1958 in Italian sport